The Festival of World Cups was a series of rugby league World Cups held in Australia during 2008. The Festival was being staged in Australia during 2008 to coincide with their Centenary of Rugby League celebrations. The centrepiece of the Festival was the men's 2008 Rugby League World Cup. In addition to this tournament, there were also world cups being held for University, Police, Women, Defence and Wheelchair teams.

The Universities tournament officially started the Festival. Colin Love, the Rugby League World Cup 2008 Tournament Director and RLIF Chairman, stated "The festival highlights how the World Cup is embracing the Rugby League community and acknowledging its wide-ranging affiliates", adding "It’s a great opportunity to showcase the broad appeal of the game internationally".

Festival schedule
The Festival of World Cups included:

University

The seventh University Rugby League World Cup was held in July, being the first of the six world cups to be held. The previous tournament was held in 2005 and won by New Zealand. The eight countries that took part were Australia, New Zealand, England, Greece, Scotland, Wales, France and Ireland. Australia defeated England in the final, while Greece won the plate competition.

Men

The thirteenth Rugby League World Cup was held throughout October and November. Ten teams took part.  Defending Champions and hosts Australia, New Zealand, England, France and Papua New Guinea all qualified automatically, while Fiji, Tonga, Samoa, Ireland and Scotland all qualified through tournaments in 2006 and 2007. The final was held at Suncorp Stadium on 22 November.

Police

The inaugural International Police Rugby League World Cup was held during November alongside the Women's Rugby League World Cup at Stockland Park.  The final was held as a curtain raiser to the first semi-final of the men's World Cup at Suncorp Stadium. AMP sponsored the event with organisers hoping would go towards the formation of an International Police Rugby League Federation.

Women

The third Women's Rugby League World Cup was held at Stockland Park alongside the Police World Cup. Eight teams took part including defending champions New Zealand. The final was held at Suncorp Stadium on 15 November.

Defence

The inaugural Defence Forces World Cup was held in Sydney with the final played at the Sydney Football Stadium as a curtain raiser to the second Semi Final of the Men's tournament. Five defence forces took part, New Zealand, Australia, Great Britain, Papua New Guinea and the Cook Islands.

Wheelchair

Four teams took part in the inaugural Wheelchair Rugby League World Cup which was held at indoor venues in Sydney. The four teams were France, Australia, England and a Barbarians V. New Zealand withdrew from the tournament.

References

External links
 Universities World Cup official site
 Rugby League World Cup official site
 RLIF official site 

Festival of World Cups